E 005 is a European B class road in Uzbekistan, connecting the cities G‘uzor – Samarkand.

Route 

 G‘uzor
 Samarkand

Lack of signage 
The E005 does not carry an official national route number. Lying completely in Uzbekistan, no part of the E005 is signed as such.

References

External links 
 UN Economic Commission for Europe: Overall Map of E-road Network (2007)

International E-road network
Roads in Uzbekistan